The 2022–23 Ligue 2, commonly known as 2022–23 Ligue 2 BKT for sponsorship reasons, is the 84th season of Ligue 2. It began on 30 July 2022 and will conclude on 3 June 2023. The league will have a break from 12 November to 27 December due to the FIFA World Cup. Two clubs will be promoted to Ligue 1 at the end of the season as the number of clubs in Ligue 1 will be reduced from 20 to 18. As a result, no play-offs will be held at the end of the season.

Teams

Team changes

Stadiums and locations

Personnel and kits

Managerial changes

League table

Positions by round
The table lists the positions of teams after each week of matches. In order to preserve chronological evolvements, any postponed matches are not included to the round at which they were originally scheduled, but added to the full round they were played immediately afterwards.

Results

Season statistics

Top goalscorers

Number of teams by regions

References

Ligue 2 seasons
2
France
France, 2